Kristen Noel Swanson (born December 19, 1969) is an American actress. She is best recognized for having played Buffy Summers in the 1992 film Buffy the Vampire Slayer and appeared in the 1996 film The Phantom.

Her first starring role was in Wes Craven's horror film Deadly Friend (1986), followed by her portrayal of Catherine "Cathy" Dollanganger in the film adaptation of V. C. Andrews's  Flowers in the Attic (1987). Swanson also starred in several films, including Hot Shots! (1991), The Program (1993), The Chase (1994), 8 Heads in a Duffel Bag (1997), Big Daddy (1999), and Dude, Where's My Car? (2000), and appeared in Pretty in Pink (1986) and Ferris Bueller's Day Off (1986).

Early life
Swanson was raised in Mission Viejo, California. At the age of nine, she expressed interest in acting to her parents, and began pursuing roles in television commercials. She landed her first job appearing in a doll house commercial, which was followed with several more commercial appearances.

Career
Swanson began her acting career at The Actors Workshop with R. J. Adams and promptly moved into TV advertising roles and several one-off appearances in TV series such as Cagney and Lacey and Alfred Hitchcock Presents. In 1986, she debuted on the big screen in two John Hughes films: Pretty In Pink, in a non-speaking role, and Ferris Bueller's Day Off as a character who announces a convoluted excuse for Ferris's absence in class. Her first starring role was later in 1986, in Wes Craven's Deadly Friend as Samantha"the girl next door." The next year she played Cathy in the adaptation of V. C. Andrews' best-seller, Flowers in the Attic.

Swanson described how she was cast in Pretty in Pink: "[Writer] John Hughes said, 'We're re-shooting the end of Pretty in Pink. I was wondering if you would come be in this scene with our main character, Ducky, because the way we tested it in the movie theater, it didn't work. We need him to end up with somebody else at the end of the movie. So would you play the part?'"

By 1990, Swanson had made many television appearances, including multiple appearances in Knots Landing (1987–1988), Nightingales (1989), her first starring role in a television series, although it only lasted a season, and a short-lived Burt Reynolds television series called B.L. Stryker (1989).

Throughout the 1990s, she starred mostly in films. She played the title role in the 1992 film Buffy the Vampire Slayer. Although not a hit at the box office originally, it had a profitable rental life. She appeared in both starring and supporting roles in films such as Hot Shots!, The Program, The Chase, or her most critically acclaimed role, playing Kristen Connor, a student discovering her sexuality, in John Singleton's Higher Learning. She also appeared in the film adaptation of the comic-book The Phantom and the dark comedy 8 Heads in a Duffel Bag with Joe Pesci. Most of these films failed at the box office and she reverted to television work, in the late 1990s.

In the 1998–99 season of Early Edition, Swanson played Erica Paget, a love interest of the main character, Gary Hobson. In 1999, Swanson played Vanessa, the ex-girlfriend of Adam Sandler in the film Big Daddy. In 2000, she returned to a television series, as the star of Grapevine, a revamp of a 1992 TV series that was canceled after five episodes. The same year, she starred in the successful film Dude, Where's My Car?, alongside Ashton Kutcher, Seann William Scott and Jennifer Garner.

Swanson posed nude for Playboy magazine in November 2002 in a cover-featured pictorial. She appeared in and won in the 2006 Fox television program Skating with Celebrities, partnered with Lloyd Eisler.

In 2007, she became a spokesperson of the Medifast diet. In the following year, she guest-starred in three episodes of the lesbian web series 3Way. The same year she appeared in Law & Order: Criminal Intent (TV Series), Bombshell episode as Lorelai Mailer.

In 2021, a release date of June 15 was announced for Swanson's recent feature and a Jennifer Nichole Lee and Paul Schneider collaboration, Just Another Dream. She co-starred alongside long-time friend Dean Cain.

Personal life
Swanson married her Skating with Celebrities partner Lloyd Eisler in 2009. They have a son, and two children from his previous marriage.

Swanson is a Republican. Swanson reported that she and fellow actor Dean Cain received death threats for taking part in Obamagate, a stage play that focused on Donald Trump.

Filmography

Film
{| class="wikitable sortable"
|-
! Year
! Title
! Role
! class="unsortable" | Notes
|-
|1986
|Pretty in Pink
|Duckette
|
|-
|1986
|Ferris Bueller's Day Off
|Simone Adamley
|
|-
|1986
|Deadly Friend
|Samantha Pringle
|
|-
|1987
|Flowers in the Attic
|Catherine "Cathy" Dollanganger
|
|-
|1990
|Dream Trap
|Sue Halloran
|
|-
|1990
|Diving In
|Terry Hopkins
|
|-
|1991
|Mannequin Two: On the Move
|Jessie
|
|-
|1991
|Hot Shots!
|Kowalski
|
|-
|1991
|Highway to Hell
|Rachel Clark
|
|-
|1992
|Buffy the Vampire Slayer
| Buffy Summers
|
|-
|1993
|The Program
|Camille Shafer
|
|-
|1994
|
|Natalie Voss
|
|-
|1994
|Getting In
|Kirby Watts
|
|-
|1995
|Higher Learning
|Kristen Connor
|
|-
|1995
|
|Julie
|Short film
|-
|1996
|
|Diana Palmer
|
|-
|1997
|8 Heads in a Duffel Bag
|Laurie Bennett
|
|-
|1997
|Lover Girl
|Darlene Ferrari / "Sherry"
|
|-
|1997
|Tinseltown
|Nikki Randall
|
|-
|1998
|Ground Control
|Julie Albrecht
|
|-
|1999
|Big Daddy
|Vanessa
|
|-
|2000
|Meeting Daddy
|Laurel Lee
|
|-
|2000
|Dude, Where's My Car?
|Christie Boner
|
|-
|2001
|Soul Assassin
|Tessa Jansen
|
|-
|2003
|Silence
|Dr. Julia Craig
|
|-
|2005
|Bound by Lies
|Laura Cross
|Video
|-
|2005
|Six Months Later
|Linda
|Short film
|-
|2006
|Living Death
|Elizabeth Harris
|Video
|-
|2009
|
|Kaitlyn
|Short film
|-
|2010
|What If...
|Wendy Walker
|This was her first theatrical film in nine years.
|-
|2011
|Chick Magnet
|Kristy
|Video
|-
|2012
|Little Women, Big Cars
|Rocky
|
|-
|2013
|
|Terri Benton
|
|-
|2013
|Storm Rider
|Jody Peterson
|Video
|-
|2014
|Beethoven's Treasure Tail
|Anne Parker
|Video
|-
|2014
|A Belle For Christmas
|Daniella Downy
|Video
|-
|2015
|Angels in the Snow
|Judith Montgomery
|Video
|-
|2017
|A Parent's Worst Nightmare
|Kathrin
|Television film
|-
|2017
|A Mother's Sacrifice
|Joanna
|
|-
|2017
|Crowning Jules
|Victoria
|
|-
|2018
|Killer Under the Bed
|Sarah
|
|-
|2020
|The ObamaGate Movie
|Lisa Page
|Online release
|-
|2021
|Just Another Dream
|Cindy Miller
|Video
|-
|2021
|Courting Mom and Dad|Sarah Lambert
|
|}

Television

Awards and nominations
Wins
 1989: Young Artist Award for Best Young Actress in a Horror or Mystery Motion PictureFlowers in the Attic 2019: Independent Women's Forum Annual Award GalaResilience Award

Nominations
 2021: Royal Starr Film Festival for Best Feature FilmJust Another Dream 2012: Movieguide Awards for Most Inspirational Television ActingA Christmas Wish 2011: Movieguide Awards for Most Inspiring Movie ActingWhat If... 1992: Fangoria Chainsaw Award for Best ActressBuffy the Vampire Slayer 1988: Young Artist Award for Best Young Female Superstar in Motion PicturesDeadly Friend 1987: Young Artist Award for Exceptional Young Actress Starring in a Television Special or Movie of the WeekMr. Boogedy 1986: Young Artist Award for Best Young ActressGuest in a Television SeriesCagney & Lacey'' episode "On the Street"

References

External links

 
 

Living people
20th-century American actresses
21st-century American actresses
Actresses from California
American child actresses
American Christians
American film actresses
American television actresses
California Republicans
Participants in American reality television series
People from Mission Viejo, California
1969 births